Udhavikku Varalaamaa is a 1998 Indian Tamil-language comedy film directed by Gokula Krishnan. The film stars Karthik, Devayani, Sangeetha and Anju Aravind, with Janagaraj, Pandiyan, Vadivukkarasi, Manivannan, Kovai Sarala and Jai Ganesh playing supporting roles. It was released on 16 January 1998 and became a failure at box-office. This was Gokula Krishna's last film as director and continued as dialogue writer before his death in 2008 and also was his last collaboration with Karthik after Poovarasan and Muthu Kaalai.

Plot 

Muthurasu has come to the city to earn money to finance his mother's operation and asks for ideas from his friend Annamalai. To rent a place owned by a Brahmin couple, Muthurasu transforms himself into a Brahmin Pichumani and also falls in love with Mythili, the couple's daughter. Getting a job at a company owned by a devout Muslim makes him put on the garb of Hussein, a Muslim. Things get more complicated when an unsafe situation makes him take on the role of Pastor James, a Christian and Stella, his secretary in the office where he works as Hussein, falls in love with him.

Cast 

Karthik as Muthurasu / Pichumani / Hussein / Pastor James
Devayani as Mythili
Sangeetha (credited as Rasiga) as Stella
Anju Aravind as Aisha
Janagaraj as Annamalai
Pandiyan as Paalrasu
Vadivukkarasi as Mutharasu's mother
Manivannan as Mythili's father
Kovai Sarala as Mythili's mother
Jai Ganesh as Aisha's father
Kaka Radhakrishnan as Hussein's father
J. Lalitha as Stela's mother
Shakeela as an item number

Soundtrack 

The music was composed by Sirpy, with lyrics written by Palani Bharathi.

Reception 

Arvind of Indolink criticised the film and lead actor Karthik: "Karthik should spit out whatever he has in his mouth before delivering the dialogues. His mannerisms are also getting on people's nerves." A reviewer from Screen called the film "a total farce which taxes the patience of the viewers", noting it was a "washout" at the box office.

References

External links
 

1990s Tamil-language films
1998 comedy films
1998 films
Films directed by Gokula Krishnan
Films scored by Sirpy
Indian comedy films